Associazione Calcio Dilettantistica Torgiano is an Italian association football club located in Torgiano, Umbria. It currently plays in Serie D. Its colors are yellow and blue.

External links
Torgiano page at Serie-D.com

Football clubs in Umbria
1945 establishments in Italy